The New Yamuna Bridge is a cable-stayed bridge located in Allahabad (Prayagraj). The bridge was constructed by the end of 2004 with the aim of minimizing the traffic over the Old Naini Bridge. The bridge runs north–south across the Yamuna river connecting the city of Prayagraj to its neighborhood of Naini. The construction was consulted by COWI A/S, a Danish consulting company. Main construction was done by Hyundai and was successfully completed in 2004.

Gallery

Bridge Specifications

The total length of the bridge is 1,510 m with a longest span of 260 m which is supported by a cable which stays in a concrete anchor bridges.

See also
 List of tourist attractions in Allahabad
 List of largest cable-stayed bridges in the World
 List of longest bridges above water in India
 List of bridges in India
 List of bridges
 Old Naini Bridge

References

Buildings and structures in Allahabad
Bridges in Uttar Pradesh
Cable-stayed bridges in India
Transport in Allahabad
Bridges over Yamuna River